Goitaca is a 2021 indigenous adventure drama film directed by Rodrigo Rodrigues, shot in the Atlantic Rainforest in Brazil.

Premise 
The film tells the story between two divisive indigenous tribes during a time long past in history: the Goitaca, and an unknown tribe which embarks on a journey to find new lands in order to live peacefully.

Cast 

 Marlon Blue as Candea
 Leandro Firmino as Goitaca Chief
 Rodrigo Rodrigues as Shaman Bacuara and Jurema
 Lady Francisco as Mother Ci and Iara—Mother of Water
 Luciano Szafir as Maracajaguacu
 Christianne Oliveira as Camapua
 Macximo Bossimo as Chief Catu
 Helder Cardozo as Shaman Abeguar
 Betto Marque as Obita
 Olivia Harriet as Mermaid Iara
 Daniel Bauerfeldt as Obajara
 Joao Alberto Tchian as The secret
 Dinosio Correa as Apua
 Evelyn Mayrink as Jacina
 Fernanda Magnani as Candea's mother
 Marcos Accogli as Iara's guardian/Wooden mermaid
 Arthur Benatti Teixeira as The guardian of the stars
 Bradley Rodgers as Candea Pequeno (Voice)
 Emilio Dante as Jaguarari (Voice)
 Sally Bosman as Iara and Mother Ci (Voice)
 Mark Keegan as Iara's guardian (Voice)
 Jim Cooper as The Secret (Voice)
 Lucas Jordan as Indigenous warrior
 Victor Vasconcelos as Candea pequeno
 Danillo Sales as Jaguarari
 Diogo Alves as Taquarace Pequeno
 Yago Brasil as Taquarace
 Victoria Vasconcelos as Camapua Pequeno
 Pedro Malta as Chief Aimore 
 Bruna Barbosa as Indigenous waterfall

Production 

The film is inspired by Rodrigues's experiences during his time in the Atlantic rain forest. Rodrigues stated that the spirits of the rain forest led him to write the screenplay within three days and nights during his stay.

Locations 
Goitaca was filmed at Rodrigo Rodrigues Studios Paraty, in the Atlantic region of Brazil. Five weeks were spent near Ipiabas, in the state of Rio, the department of Fazenda Sao Sebastiao, and ten weeks in Paraty between July 2016 until August 2019.

Location details include:

Pre-production: United Kingdom/Brazil

 London.
 Jundiai
 Itupeva 
 Rio de Janeiro
 Paraty
 Barra do Pirai

Production—Brazil:

 Rodrigo Rodrigues Studios 
 Hotel Fazenda Sao Sebastiao
 Pousada Casa Delta
 Hospedaria Abbud & Fernandez
 Barra do Pirai

Post-production—United Kingdom/Brazil/Peru

 London
 Birmingham
 Tarapoto 
 Lima
 Jundiai
 Paraty

Accolades

References

External links
 
 
 
 

Films set in Brazil
Films shot in Brazil
Indigenous cinema in Latin America
2021 films
2020s English-language films